Biadacz refers to the following places in Poland:

 Biadacz, Kluczbork County
 Biadacz, Opole County